Hugh Ross (born 28 April 1945) is a Scottish actor, with a wide variety of British TV, film and theatre credits. He is known for his supporting roles in the films Trainspotting and Bronson; and for his performances as Major Mungo Munro in the Sharpe, and as Narcisse in Clive Barker’s Nightbreed.

Biography

Career
Ross was born in Glasgow, where his parents were both doctors. He was educated at The Glasgow Academy, an independent school, followed by the University of St Andrews.  He then trained at the Royal Academy of Dramatic Art in London.

Ross began his career in repertory all over England. He played Romeo (1971) at the Open-air Theatre in Regent’s Park; Jaques in As You Like It (1990) for the Royal Shakespeare Company; and Dr Brooks in Lady in the Dark (1997) at the National Theatre. In 1997, he was nominated for an Laurence Olivier Award for Best Performance in a Supporting Role in a Musical for his performance in Stephen Sondheim’s Passion at the Queen’s Theatre in London’s West End. His performance as Malvolio in Cheek by Jowl’s Twelfth Night (1987) won the Time Out Performer Award. In 2010, he played Polonius in Hamlet at the Crucible Theatre, Sheffield, with John Simm; and in 2013, Duncan in Macbeth with James McAvoy at the Trafalgar Studios in London.

In September 2016, his production company, The Other Cheek, in association with Cahoots Theatre Company, presented a revival of J. B. Priestley’s The Roundabout at the Park Theatre, London, to great acclaim. Hugh is currently directing the West End production of The Mousetrap at the St. Martin's Theatre.

Hugh is a member of the Associate committee of RADA. Royal Academy of Dramatic Art

TV and filmography

References

External links 
 Official Site: Hugh Ross
 
 Interview with Hugh Ross
 Interview with Hugh Ross on his role in Counter-Measures
 Catalogue of Hugh Ross' work with Big Finish
 The Daily Telegraph review of Plague over England 2009
 Production details of Twelfth Night 2014
 The Guardian review of Twelfth Night 2014

1945 births
20th-century Scottish male actors
21st-century Scottish male actors
Male actors from Glasgow
Alumni of RADA
Scottish male stage actors
Scottish male television actors
Living people
Alumni of the University of St Andrews